Kyong (also known as Kyon) was a Shan state in the Myelat region of what is today Burma.

Rulers 
The title of Kyong's rulers was Ngwegunhmu.
.... - ....                Maung Aung Hla
....  - 1867               Maung San Nyun 
1867 - ....                Maung Po                           (b. 1841 - d. ....)
c.1910                     Maung Kaing

References

19th century in Burma
Shan States